The Empire cast has released 4 soundtrack albums, twelve extended plays (EPs), and 29 singles. Empire features on-screen performance-based musical numbers, which are original songs of popular songs, with genres ranging from R&B to pop and Rap & Hip-Hop.

For the first season, the group's debut album, Empire: Original Soundtrack from Season 1, was released by Columbia Records on March 10, 2015, The soundtrack received positive critical reception and debuted at number one on the Billboard 200 chart in the United States, 110,000 copies in the first week. On September 11, 2015, another soundtrack titled Empire: The Complete Season 1 was released containing every song heard on the show that weren't included on the official soundtrack. As of December 2015, the album has sold 470,000 total copies in the United States. In January 2016, the album was certified Gold in the United States.

Soundtrack albums

Season 1: 2015

Other charted songs
A number of songs that were not specifically released as singles, but could still be individually downloaded from their albums/EPs, received enough individual downloads to appear on the singles charts.

Notes

References

Film and television discographies